The 37th New Brunswick Legislative Assembly represented New Brunswick between February 12, 1931, and May 22, 1935.

Hugh Havelock McLean served as Lieutenant-Governor of New Brunswick.

Frederick C. Squires was chosen as speaker.

The Conservative Party led by John Babington Macaulay Baxter formed the government. Baxter was replaced by Charles Dow Richards in 1931. Leonard P. Tilley became leader in 1933 after Richards left politics.

History

Members 

Notes:

References 
 Canadian Parliamentary Guide, 1934, AL Normandin

Terms of the New Brunswick Legislature
1931 establishments in New Brunswick
1935 disestablishments in New Brunswick
20th century in New Brunswick